The First Mission House (First Mission House and Place of Worship; First Moravian Mission) is a historic church and mission house at 291 Third Avenue in Bethel, Alaska. The wood-frame structure was the first to be built in Bethel, in 1885. It was designed by Hans Torgersen, one of the first group of Moravian missionaries sent to the area, but he died in a boating accident before it was built, and it was completed by two priests with no significant construction experience. Although the building received some alterations, it was restored to its early appearance in 1985. The building has been moved three times, primarily due to erosion along the Kuskokwim River.

It was built in 1945 and added to the National Register of Historic Places in 1990.

See also
National Register of Historic Places listings in Bethel Census Area, Alaska

References

Bethel, Alaska
Churches completed in 1945
Churches on the National Register of Historic Places in Alaska
History of the Alaska Province of the Moravian Church
Buildings and structures on the National Register of Historic Places in Bethel Census Area, Alaska
Relocated buildings and structures in Alaska